James Hamilton Goss (August 9, 1820 – October 31, 1886) was a U.S. Representative from South Carolina during the Reconstruction era.

Born in Union, South Carolina, Goss attended the common schools and the Union Male Academy.  He engaged in mercantile pursuits.  He served with the South Carolina Militia during the Civil War.

He served as delegate to the State constitutional convention in 1867.  Upon the readmission of the State of South Carolina to representation, he was elected as a Republican to the Fortieth Congress and served from July 18, 1868, to March 3, 1869.  He was not a candidate for renomination in 1868.

He served as member of the board of commissioners of Union County 1871-1874.  He was appointed postmaster of Union August 12, 1875, and served until September 23, 1884.

He died in Union, South Carolina, October 31, 1886.  He was interred in the Presbyterian Cemetery.

Sources

1820 births
1886 deaths
Confederate States Army personnel
Republican Party members of the United States House of Representatives from South Carolina
19th-century American politicians